Credo is an album by Swedish singer Carola Häggkvist. It was released in May 2004 in Sweden, Denmark, Finland and Norway. On the album charts, it peaked at number two in Sweden.

Track listing
"Ditt ord består" (H. Nyberg) 
"Åt alla" (John 1:12/P. Sandvall) 
"Som en båt" (L. Axelsson) 
"Gud jag behöver Dig" (P. Holmberg/D. Ejderfors) 
"Du vet väl om att du är värdefull" (I. Olsson) 
"Så älskade Gud hela världen" (John 3:16/T. Hagenfors) 
"För att Du inte tog det gudomliga" (O. Hartman/B. Ring) 
"Lova Gud o min själ" (C. Hultgren) 
"Herre, till Dig får jag komma" (A. Crouch/P. Sandvall) 
"Din trofasta kärlek" (E. McNeill/I-M. Eriksson)
"Jag vill ge dig o Herre min lovsång" (C. Hultgren)
"Namnet Jesus" (D. Welander /Zulu trad./J. Gustavsson)
"Låt mina fötter få gå" (U. Ringbäck)
"I frid vill jag lägga mig ner" (Psalm 4:9/S. Eriksson)

Release history

Charts

References

2004 albums
Carola Häggkvist albums
Swedish-language albums